Uruguayans in Germany are people born in Uruguay who live in Germany, or German-born people of Uruguayan descent.

Overview
Generally speaking, Uruguayans went to Germany as part of a wave of emigration due to economic or political reasons. Many of them got established in Germany for decades.

In the GDR
During the civic-military dictatorship in Uruguay, the German Democratic Republic received several exiled Uruguayan communists. Maybe the most prominent of them was Marina Arismendi (a future Senator and Minister in the 2000s), who spent there many years as a Spanish-language teacher.

Institutions
Uruguayans have their own institutions in Germany, such as the Deutsch-Uruguayische Gesellschaft e.V.

Notable people 
 Adrian Sutil, sportsman
 Bob Humid, DJ
 Carlos Nevado, field hockey player
 Enrique Loedel Palumbo, scientist
 Gary Kagelmacher, footballer
 Nicolás Pasquet, musician
 Marina Arismendi, politician and teacher

See also
German Uruguayans
Germany–Uruguay relations
Emigration from Uruguay

Bibliography

References

Ethnic groups in Germany
 
 
Germany